William Borland (born 21 September 1952) was a Scottish footballer who played for  St Mirren, Barrow, Dumbarton and Stranraer.

References

1952 births
Scottish footballers
St Mirren F.C. players
Barrow A.F.C. players
Dumbarton F.C. players
Stranraer F.C. players
Scottish Football League players
Living people
Association football outside forwards